Camp Moshava may refer to:

 Camp Moshava (Bnei Akiva), affiliated camps of Bnei Akiva in the United States and Canada
 Camp Moshava (Habonim Dror), an affiliate camp of Habonim Dror in Street, Maryland